Ava Carroll Waller (August 8, 1927 – October 28, 2014) was an American preservationist, writer and former First Lady of the U.S. state of Mississippi. Waller served as the First Lady of Mississippi from 1972 to 1976 during the administration of her husband, the late Governor Bill Waller. Carroll Waller spearheaded the restoration of the Mississippi Governor's Mansion in Jackson, Mississippi. She also led the move to have the Governor's Mansion designated as a National Historic Landmark in 1975, which was only the second time that a governor's residence had been listed as a NHL in the U.S. Additionally, Waller helped to purchase and restore the Manship House in Jackson. In 1980, the Mississippi Historical Society awarded Carroll Waller its Award of Merit for her work in historic preservation in the state.

Carroll Waller was the mother of William L. Waller Jr., who has served as the Chief Justice of the Supreme Court of Mississippi since 2009.

Waller was born Ava Carroll Overton in McComb, Mississippi, on August 8, 1927, to Dr. Clayton Justice Overton and Edith Watkins Overton. She graduated from Central High School in Jackson, Mississippi, and received a degree from Mississippi College in Clinton. She worked as an instructor at Belhaven College (now Belhaven University) and a salesperson at the House of Overton in Jackson early in her career.

References

1927 births
2014 deaths
First Ladies and Gentlemen of Mississippi
Historical preservationists
American non-fiction writers
Mississippi College alumni
Writers from Jackson, Mississippi
Belhaven University